Benidipine  is a dihydropyridine calcium channel blocker for the treatment of high blood pressure (hypertension). It is a triple L-, T-, and N-type calcium channel blocker. It is reno- and cardioprotective.

It was patented in 1981 and approved for medical use in 1991.

Dosing 
Benidipine is dosed as 2–8 mg once daily.

Mechanism
Benidipine is a calcium channel blocker.

Benidipine has additionally been found to act as an antagonist of the mineralocorticoid receptor, or as an antimineralocorticoid.

Names
Other names include Benidipinum or benidipine hydrochloride.

Benidipine is sold as Coniel by Kyowa Hakko Kogyo.

Benidipine is initially licensed for use in Japan and selected Southeast Asian countries and later in Turkey, where it is sold as 4 mg tablets.

References 

Antimineralocorticoids
Aldosterone synthase inhibitors
Calcium channel blockers
Carboxylate esters
Dihydropyridines
Methyl esters
Nitrobenzenes
Piperidines